The United States Navy, like any organization, produces its own acronyms and abbreviations, which often come to have meaning beyond their bare expansions. United States Navy personnel sometimes colloquially refer to these as NAVSpeak. Like other organizational colloquialisms, their use often creates or reinforces a sense of esprit and closeness within the organization.

Official acronyms
For a comprehensive list of unit organizations in the United States Navy, see List of units of the United States Navy.

#
 1MC – 1 Main Circuit, shipboard public address system
 2MC – 2 Main Circuit, same as 1MC, but limited to the engine room
 3M – Maintenance and Material Management (3M System)
 3MA – Maintenance and Material Management Assistant
 3MC – Maintenance and Material Management Coordinator
 3MI – Maintenance and Material Management Inspection
 5MC – 5 Main Circuit, Carrier Flight Deck address system
 27MC – Control Room to Sonar Room address system

A
 A-STRIKE – Assistant STRIKE Operations Officer (Carrier Scheduler/Planner)
 AA – Airman Apprentice (E-2)
 AAW – Anti-Air Warfare
 AB – Aviation Boatswain's Mate
 ABE – Aviation Boatswain's Mate – Equipment (Launch and Recovery Systems)
 ABF – Aviation Boatswain's Mate (Fuels)
 ABFD – Advanced Base Floating Dry Dock, class/type of ship
 ABH – Aviation Boatswain's Mate (Aircraft Handling)
 AC – Air Traffic Controlman
 ACR – Armored cruiser, class/type of ship
 AD – Auxiliary, Destroyer Tender, class/type of ship
 AD – Aviation Machinist's Mate
 ADCON – Administrative control
 ADNS – Automated Digital Network System
 ADSW – Active Duty Special Work (U.S. Navy Reserve, type of active duty orders, typically 6 months in duration)
 ADT – Active Duty Training (U.S. Navy Reserve, type of active duty orders, typically more than 30 days but less than 6 months)
 AE – Auxiliary, Explosives, class/type of ship. An ammunition ship.
 AE – Aviation Electrician's Mate
 AF – Aviation Photographer's Mate
 AFC – Aviation Fire Control
 AFCM – Master Chief Aircraft Maintenanceman
 AFFF – Aqueous Film Forming Foam
 AFS – Auxiliary, Fast Stores, class/type of ship. A supply ship that carries a little bit of everything, nicknamed "7-11"
 AFSB – Afloat Forward Staging Base
 AG – Aerographer's Mate
 AIMD – Aircraft Intermediate Maintenance Department (or Detachment)
 AK – Auxiliary, Cargo, class/type of ship. An attack transport.
 AK – Aviation Storekeeper (outdated; merged into LS rating)
 ALNAV – All Navy
 ALPO – Assistant Lead Petty Officer
 AM – Aviation Structural Mechanic
 AME – Aviation Structural Mechanic – Environmental (Air Conditioning, Oxygen, and Ejection Seats), Aviation Mechanical Exception
 AMH – Aviation Structural Mechanic – Hydraulics
 AMMRL – Aviation Maintenance Material Readiness List
 AMO – Assistant Maintenance Officer
 AMS – Aviation Structural Mechanic – Structures
 AN – Airman
 AO – Auxiliary, Fleet Oil, class/type of ship; Aviation Ordnanceman
 AOE – Auxiliary, Oil, Explosives, class/type of ship.
 AOR – Auxiliary, Oil, Replenishment, class/type of ship
 AOW – Auxiliaryman of the Watch
 API – Aviation Preflight Indoctrination
 AR – Auxiliary, Repair, class/type of ship. A repair ship
 AR – Airman Recruit (E-1)
 ARRS – Afloat Readiness Reporting System
 ARS – Auxiliary, Repair and Salvage, class/type of ship
 AS – Auxiliary, Submarine Tender, class/type of ship
 AS – Aviation Support Equipment Technician
 ASAU – Air Search and Attack Unit
 ASR – Auxiliary, Submarine Rescue, class/type of ship
 ASUW – Anti-Surface Warfare
 ASVAB – Armed Services Vocational Aptitude Battery
 ASW – Auxiliary Seawater system
 ASW – Anti-Submarine Warfare
 ASWO – Anti-Submarine Warfare Officer
 AT – Annual Training (U.S. Navy Reserve, type of active duty orders, typically less than 30 days)
 AT – Aviation Electronics Technician
 ATS – Auxiliary, Towing and Salvage, class/type of ship
 AUTEC – Atlantic Undersea Test and Evaluation Center
 AUXO – Auxiliaries Officer
 AVCM – Master Chief Avionics Technician
 AVGAS – Aviation Gasoline
 AWCS – Assistant Work Center Supervisor
 AZ – Aviation Maintenance Administrationman

B
 B/N – Bombardier/Navigator; NFO in A-3B Skywarrior, A-5A Vigilante and A-6 Intruder attack aircraft (no longer used)
 BAM – Bad Ass Marine ("Broad Ass Marine" if used in reference to a female)
 BB – Battleship
 BCD – Bad Conduct Discharge (also colloquially known as "Big Chicken Dinner")
 BCGs –  Birth Control Glasses
 BCM – Beyond Capable Maintenance. Equipment status that indicates the item cannot be repaired and must be sent out for rework or disposed.
 BEQ – Bachelor Enlisted Quarters
 BESS – Basic Enlisted Submarine School
 BJOQ – Blue Jacket of the Quarter
 BJOY – Blue Jacket of the Year
 BLUF – Bottom Line Up Front
 BM – Boatswain's Mate
 BMOW – Boatswain's Mate of the Watch
 BOHICA – Bend Over Here It Comes Again
 BOL – BUPERS Online
 BT – Boiler Technician
 BU – Builder
 BUDS – Basic Underwater Demolition School
 BUMED – Bureau of Medicine and Surgery
 BUPERS – Bureau of Naval Personnel
 BUSANDA – Bureau of Supplies and Accounts
 BUWEPS – Bureau of Naval Weapons
 BZ – Bravo Zulu (meaning well done)

C
 CA – Construction Apprentice
 CA – Cruiser, Armoured, class/type of ship. Heavy Cruiser (outdated)
 CAG – Cruiser, Attack, Guided Missile, class/type of ship. Guided Missile Heavy Cruiser (outdated)
 CAG – Commander, Air Group
 CAPT – Captain
 CBMU – Construction Battalion Maintenance Unit
 CASCAN – CASREP Cancellation or Cancellation of Casualty Report
 CASCOR – CASREP Correction or Correction of the Casualty in the Casualty Report
 CASREP – Casualty Report
 CC – Cruiser, class/type of ship
 CCC – Comprehensive Communications Check
 CDB – Career Development Board
CDC – Combat Direction Center (CIC on carriers)
 CDO – Command Duty Officer
 CDR – Commander
 CE – Construction Electrician
 CEC – Civil Engineer Corps
 CEC – Cooperative Engagement Capability
 CED – Current Enlistment Date
 CENTCOM – U.S. Central Command (USCENTCOM)
 CF – Charlie Foxtrot (polite form of "Cluster Fuck")
 CG – Cruiser, Guided Missile, class/type of ship
 CGN – Cruiser, Guided Missile, Nuclear, class/type of ship (outdated)
 CHC – Chief of Chaplains of the United States Navy
 CHENG – Chief Engineer (surface only)
 CHMC – Chaplain of the United States Marine Corps (always a Navy flag officer)
 CIC – Combat Information Center
 CICO – Combat Information Center Officer
 CIS – CASREP Information System
 CIVLANT – "Civilian Life" as defined by Atlantic Fleet personnel
 CIVPAC – "Civilian Life" as defined by Pacific Fleet personnel
 CIWS – Close-In Weapon System
 CM – Construction Mechanic
 CMC – Commandant of the Marine Corps or Chaplain of the Marine Corps or Command Master Chief
 CMDCM – Command Master Chief
 CMDCS – Command Senior Chief
 CMS-ID – Career Management System-Interactive Detailing
 CN – Constructionman
 CNATRA – Chief of Naval Air Training
 CNAVRES – Chief of Navy Reserve
 CNET – Command Naval Education and Training
 CNIC – Commander, Navy Installations Command
 CNO – Chief of Naval Operations
 CO – Commanding Officer
 COB – Chief of the Boat (traditionally found only on submarines; pronounced "cob"). Can also be used for "close of business" (pronounced "C-O-B").
 COD – Carrier Onboard Delivery
 COMCVW – Commander, Carrier Air Wing
 COMDESGRU – Commander, Destroyer Group
 COMDESRON – Commander, Destroyer Squadron
 COMEX – Commence Exercise
 COMLANTFLT – Commander, U.S. Atlantic Fleet
 COMMO – Communications Officer
 COMNAVAIRES – Commander, Naval Air Force, Reserve
 COMNAVAIRFOR (also CNAF) – Commander, Naval Air Forces
 COMNAVAIRLANT (also CNAL) – Commander, Naval Air Force Atlantic
 COMNAVAIRPAC – Commander, Naval Air Force Pacific
 COMNAVRESFOR – Commander, Navy Reserve Forces
 COMNAVSEASYSCOM – Commander, Naval Sea Systems Command
 COMNAVSECGRU – Commander, Naval Security Group
 COMPACFLT – Commander, Pacific Fleet (formerly CINCPACFLT)
 COMPATRECONGRU – Commander, Patrol and Reconnaissance Group
 COMPATRECONWING – Commander, Patrol and Reconnaissance Wing
 COMPTUEX – Composite Training Unit Exercise
 COMSEC – Communications Security
 COMSUBFOR – Commander, Submarine Forces
 COMSUBLANT – Commander, Submarine Force Atlantic
 COMSUBPAC – Commander, Submarine Force, U.S. Pacific Fleet
 COMTACGRU – Commander, Tactical Air Control Group
 COMTRAWING – Commander, Training Air Wing
 CORTRAMID – Career Orientation and Training for Midshipmen
 COS (also CoS) – Flag Officer's Chief of Staff
 CPO – Chief Petty Officer
 CPOM – Chief Petty Officer's Mess
 CR – Construction Recruit
 CRG – Coastal Riverine Group
 CS – Culinary Specialist
 CSADD – Coalition of Sailors Against Destructive Decisions
 CSC – Combat Systems Coordinator
 CSC – Command Senior Chief
 CSC – Culinary Specialist Chief (E-7)
 CSEC – Computerized Self Evaluation Checklist
 CSMC – Combat Systems Maintenance Center
 CSOOW – Combat Systems Officer of the Watch
 CSOSS – Combat Systems Operational Sequencing Systems
 CT – Cryptologic Technician
 CTA – Cryptologic Technician, Administrative (now-defunct, merged with yeoman)
 CTI – Cryptologic Technician, Interpretive
 CTM – Cryptologic Technician, Maintenance
 CTN – Cryptologic Technician, Networks
 CTO – Cryptologic Technician, Communications 
 CTR – Cryptologic Technician, Collection
 CTT – Cryptologic Technician, Technical
 CV – Aircraft Carrier, class/type of ship
 CVA – Aircraft Carrier, Attack, class/type of ship
 CVAN – Aircraft Carrier, Attack, Nuclear, class/type of ship
 CVN – Aircraft Carrier, Nuclear, class/type of ship
 CVW – Carrier Air Wing
 CWO – Chief Warrant Officer

D
•  D1-R  – 3M periodicity code or a shower (slang for daily, once, or as required)

 DAPA – Drug and Alcohol Programs Advisor
 DC  – Damage Controlman
 DC –  Dental Corps
 DCA – Damage Control Assistant
 DCAG – Deputy Air Wing Commander (see CAG)
 DCC – Damage Control Central
 DCO – Damage Control Officer (Chief Engineer) or Direct Commission Officer
 DCPO – Damage Control Petty Officer
 DD – Destroyer
 DDG – Guided Missile Destroyer
 DDR – Radar Picket Destroyer
 DE – Destroyer Escort
 DESDIV – Destroyer Division
 DESRON – Destroyer Squadron
 DEVGRU – Naval Special Warfare Development Group, formerly (and informally still) SEAL Team SIX
 DFM – Diesel Fuel Marine (F-76), standard Navy bunker fuel
 DILLIGAF – Does It Look Like I Give A Flip(uck), standard Navy slang
 DIRNSA – Director of the National Security Agency
 DL – Destroyer Leader (outdated)
 DLG – Guided Missile Destroyer Leader (outdated)
 DLGN – Nuclear-powered Guided Missile Destroyer Leader (outdated)
 DM – Destroyer Minelayer (outdated)
 DM – Illustrator Draftsman
 DMHRSi – Defense Medical Human Resources System – internet
 DOD (also DoD) – Department of Defense
 DoN – Department of the Navy
 DRB – Discipline Review Board
 DRRS-N – Defense Readiness Reporting System – Navy
 DS – Data Systems Technician
 DSG – Defense Strategic Guidance
 DVS – Department of Veterans Services, usually administered by each state

E
 EAOS – End of Active Obligated Service
 EAWS – Enlisted Aviation Warfare Specialist
 ECRC – Expeditionary Combat Readiness Center
 EDMC – Engineering Department Master Chief (Submarines)
 EDO – Engineering Duty Officer
 EEBD – Emergency Escape Breathing Device
 EIDWS – Enlisted Information Dominance Warfare Specialist
 EISM-Electronic Information Security Manager
 EM – Electrician's Mate
 EM – Emergency Management
 EMCON – Emissions Control
 EMI – Extra Military Instruction
 EMN – Electrician's Mate, Nuclear Field
 EMO – Electronics Material Officer
 EN – Engineman
 ENS – Ensign
 EO – Equipment Operator
 EOD – Explosive Ordnance Disposal
 EOOW – Engineering Officer of the Watch
 EOS – Enclosed Operating Space
 EOSS – Engineering Operational Sequencing Systems
 ERS – Engineroom Supervisor
 ESWS – Enlisted Surface Warfare Specialist
 ET – Electronics Technician
 ETN – Electronics Technician, Nuclear Field
 EW – Electronic Warfare
EWO – Electronic Warfare Officer
 EWS – Engineering Watch Supervisor
 EXW – Expeditionary Warfare

F
 F/MC – Fleet (or Force) Master Chief
 FA – Fireman Apprentice
 FAC – Forward Air Controller
FAC – Fast attack craft
 FAC/A – Forward Air Controller/Airborne
 FBM – Fleet Ballistic Missile
 FC – Fire Controlman
 FCDSSA - Fleet Combat Direction Systems Support Activity
 FCF – Functional Check Flight
 FCPCP – Fleet Computer Programming Center of the Pacific
 FCPOM – First Class Petty Officer's Mess
 FDO – Flight Deck Officer
 FF – Frigate, class/type of ship
 FFG – Frigate, Guided Missile, class/type of ship
FIAC – Fast Inshore Attack Craft
 FICEURLANT – Fleet Intelligence Center Europe & Atlantic
 FIGMO – F(uck) IT, Got My Orders
FIS – Fire Inhibit Switch
 FLEACT – Fleet Activity
 FLTMPS – Fleet Training Management and Planning System
 FMF – Fleet Marine Force
 FMSS – Field Medical Service School
 FN – Fireman
FNAEB – Field Naval Aviator Evaluation Board
 FNMOC – Fleet Numerical Meteorology and Oceanography Center
 FOD – Foreign Object Damage (Debris and Detection also used in some cases)
FPCON – Force Protection Condition
 FR – Fireman Recruit
 FRC – Fleet Readiness Center
 FRS – Fleet Replacement Squadron (Formerly RAG)
 FSA – Food Service Attendant
 FSO – Food Service Officer
 FT – Fire control technician
 FTB – Fire Control Technician Ballistic Missile
 FTM – Fire Control Technician Missiles
 FTN – Forget the Navy (polite form)
 FTN – Full-time Navy (humorous form)
 FTS – Full-time Support (full-time, active-duty personnel in U.S. Navy Reserve)

G
 GCCS-M – Global Command and Control System-Maritime
 GM – Gunner's Mate
 GQ – General Quarters (Call to battle stations)
 GS – Guided Missileman
 GSA – General Services Administration
 GSE- Gas Turbine Systems Technician – Electrical
 GSM- Gas Turbine Systems Technician – Mechanic

H
 HA – Hospital Apprentice
 HAC – Helicopter Aircraft Commander
 HEDSUPPACTLANT – Headquarters, Support Activity Atlantic
 HELO – Helicopter
 HM – Hospital Corpsman
 HMFIC – Head Mother Fucker In Charge (See SOPA Below)
 HN – Hospitalman
 HR – Hospital Recruit
 HS – Helicopter Squadron, Anti-Submarine Warfare (HS-4 Black Knights)
 HT – Hull Maintenance Technician

I
 IAMM – Individual Augmentation Manpower Management
 IAP – In Assignment Processing
 IAW – In Accordance With
 IC – Interior Communications Electrician
 ICO – In Case Of (or In Care Of / In Concern Of)
 IHO – Industrial Hygiene Officer
 IMF – Intermediate Maintenance Facility
 IMRL – Individual Material Readiness List
 INCOM– Incoming
 IOIC - Integrated Operational Intelligence Center
 IP – Irish Pennant – A loose thread of a Naval or Marine uniform.
 IRT – In Reference To
 IT – Information System Technician
 ITS – Information Technology Submarines

J
 JAG – Judge Advocate General's Corps, U.S. Navy
 JBD – Jet Blast Deflector (on board carriers)
 JHSV – Joint High Speed Vessel
 JO – Journalist (obsolete), Junior Officer
 JOPA – Junior Officer Protection Association
JP-5 – Jet Propellant no. 5, standard Navy jet fuel (F-44, AVCAT)
 JTF – Joint Task Force
 JTFEX – Joint Task Force Exercise

K
 KISS – Keep It Simple, Stupid

L
 LANTCOM – Atlantic Command
 LAWS – Laser Weapon System
 LCAC – Landing Craft, Air Cushion.
 LCC – Amphibious Command Ship.
 LCDR – Lieutenant Commander
 LCPO – Leading Chief Petty Officer
 LCM – Landing Craft, Mechanized, class/type of boat. Usage: LCM-4, LCM-6, LCM-8
 LCPL – Landing Craft, Personnel Launch, class/type of boat.
 LCS – Littoral Combat Ship, class/type of ship.
 LCVP – Landing Craft, Vehicle, Personnel, class/type of boat.
 LDO – Limited Duty Officer
 LES – Leave and Earnings Statement
 LHA – Landing, Helicopter, Assault, class/type of ship.
 LHD – Landing, Helicopter, Dock, class/type of ship.
 LKA – Landing, Cargo, Attack, class/type of ship.
 LPD – Landing, Personnel, Dock, class/type of ship.
 LPA – Landing, Personnel, Attack, class/type of ship.
 LPH – Landing, Personnel, Helicopter, class/type of ship.
 LPO – Leading Petty Officer
 LPOD – Last Plane On Deck
 LRAD – Long Range Acoustic Device
 LS – Logistics Specialist
 LSD – Landing Ship, Dock, class/type of ship.
 LSO – Landing Signal Officer
 LST – Landing Ship, Tank, class/type of ship.
 LT – Lieutenant
 LTJG – Lieutenant Junior Grade

M
 MAA (also meMA) – Master-at-Arms
 MALS – Marine Aviation Logistics Squadron
 MC – Mass Communication Specialist
 MCO – Material Control Officer
 MCPO – Master Chief Petty Officer
 MCPON – Master Chief Petty Officer of the Navy (pronounced "Mick Pon")
 MIDN – Midshipman
 MIDRATS – Midnight Rations
    MLCPO   – Machinery Division Leading Chief Petty Officer (Submarine)
 MM – Machinist's Mate
 MMCO – Maintenance/Material Control Officer
 MMCPO – Maintenance Master Chief Petty Officer
 MMN – Machinist's Mate, Nuclear Field
 MO – Maintenance Officer (pronounced "Moe")
 MOA – Memorandum of Agreement
 MOU – Memorandum of Understanding
 MPA – Main Propulsion Assistant
 MPA – Military Patrol Craft (P-3 Orion, etc.)
 MR – Machinery Repairman
 MRDB – Material Readiness Database
 MSG – Message
 MSW – Main Seawater System
 MT – Missile Technician
 MTS – Master Training Specialist
 MU – Musician

N
 NAB – Naval Amphibious Base
 NAF – Naval Air Facility
 NALCOMIS – Naval Aviation Logistics Command Management Information System
 NAMI – Naval Aerospace Medicine Institute
 NAS – Naval Air Station
 NAS JRB – Naval Air Station / Joint Reserve Base
 NATOPS – Naval Air Training and Operational Procedure Standardization
 NAVAIR – Naval Air Systems Command
 NAVCOMP – Comptroller of the Navy
 NAVEDTRA – Chief of Navy Education and Training
 NAVFAC – Naval Facilities Engineering Command
 NAVFLIGHTDEMRON – Navy Flight Demonstration Squadron (Blue Angels)
 NAVMAT – Naval Material Command
 NAVMILPERSCOM – Navy Military Personnel Command
 NAVSEA – Naval Sea Systems Command
 NAVSECGRUACT – Naval Security Group Activity
 NAVSTA – Naval Station
 NAVSUBASE – Naval Submarine Base
 NAVSUP – Naval Supply Systems Command
 NAVTRA – Chief of Naval Training
 NAWCAD – Naval Air Warfare Center, Aircraft Division
 NAWCWD – Naval Air Warfare Center, Weapons Division (formerly Pacific Missile Test Center)
 NBSD – Naval Base San Diego
 NC – Navy Counselor
 NCDU – Navy Combat Demolition Unit
 NCF – Naval Construction Force (Seabees)
 NCIS – Naval Criminal Investigative Service
 NCM – Navy Commendation Medal
 NCTAMS – Naval Computer and Telecommunications Area Master Station
 NCTS – Naval Computer Telecommunications Station
 NECC – Navy Expeditionary Combat Command
 NeL – Navy eLearning
 NEX – Navy Exchange
 NFAAS – Navy Family Accountability and Assessment System
 NFO – Naval Flight Officer
 NFO – Normal Fuel Oil
 NIWC – Naval Information Warfare Center (pronounced "nie-wik")
 NJROTC – Navy Junior Reserve Officers' Training Corps
 NKO – Navy Knowledge Online
 NMCB – Naval Mobile Construction Battalion Seabees
 NMCI – Navy/Marine Corps Intranet
 NMPS – Navy Mobilization and Processing Site
 NMTI – Navy Military Training Instructor
 NNPTU – Naval Nuclear Power Training Unit
 NNSY – Norfolk Naval Shipyard
 NOSC – Navy Operational Support Center (a U.S. Navy Reserve shore command)
 NOSR – Network On-Site Representative
 NPC – Navy Personnel Command
 NROTC – Navy Reserve Officer Training Corps
 NS – Naval Station
 NSAWC – Naval Strike and Air Warfare Center
 NSFO – Navy Special Fuel Oil
 NSGA – Naval Security Group Activity
 NSIPS – Navy Standard Integrated Personnel System
 NSWC – Naval Surface Warfare Center
 NSWG – Naval Special Warfare Group
 NSY – Naval Shipyard
 NTC – Naval Training Center
 NUWC – Naval Undersea Warfare Center
 NWTD – Non Watertight Door
 NWU – Navy Working Uniform

O
 OAE – Old Antarctic Explorer
 OBA – Oxygen Breathing Apparatus
 OCS – Officer Candidate School, located at Naval Station Newport
 OFS – Out Freaking Standing (polite form)
 OIC – Officer in Charge
 OM – On the Move
 OMPF – Official Military Personnel File
 ONR – Office of Naval Research
 OOC – Out of Calibration or Out of Compliance
 OOD – Officer of the Deck
 OOMA – Optimized Organizational Maintenance Activity
 OPCON – Operational control
 OPNAV – Office of the Chief of Naval Operations
 OPS-O – Operations Officer
 OSA – Overseas Contingency Operation Support Assignments
 OTSR – Optimal Track Ship Routing

P
 PACOM – Pacific Command
 PAPERCLIP – People Against People Ever Reenlisting Civilian Life Is Preferred
 PAX – Passengers
 PCO – Prospective Commanding Officer
 PCS – Permanent Change of Station
 PDHA – Post-Deployment Health Assessment
 PDHRA – Post-Deployment Health Re-Assessment
 PFA – Physical Fitness Assessment
 PHA – Physical Health Assessment
 PHRA – Physical Health Re-Assessment
 PLD – Permanent Limited Duty
 PIR – Pass in Review
PMCS – Preventative Maintenance Checks & Service(s)
 PO(3/2/1) – Petty Officer (Third/Second/First Class)
 POC – Point of Contact
 POD – Plan of the Day
 POM – Plan of the Month
 POOW – Petty Officer of the Watch
 POTUS – President of the United States
 POW – Plan of the Week
 POW – Prisoner of War
 PRD – Projected Rotation Date
 PRIFLY – Primary Flight Control (carriers)
 PRT – Physical Readiness Test
 PSNS and IMF – Puget Sound Naval Shipyard and Intermediate Maintenance Facility
 PT – Physical Training
 PTS – Perform to Serve
 PWD – Public Works Department
 PXO – Prospective Executive Officer

Q
 QAWTD/QAWTH – Quick Acting Water Tight Door/Quick Acting Water Tight Hatch
 QM – Quartermaster
 QMOW – Quartermaster of the Watch

R
 RADCON – Radiation Control
 RADM – Rear Admiral (United States) (Upper Half)
 RADM – Relational Administrative Data Management
 RAG – Replacement Air Group, now known as Fleet Replacement Squadron (FRS)
 RCA – Reactor Controls Assistant
 RDBM – Red Data-Base Manager
 RDC – Recruit Division Commander
 RDML – Rear Admiral (United States) (Lower Half)
 REPO – Repair Division Officer
 RHIB (RIB) – Rigid Hull Inflatable Boat
 RIMPAC – Rim of the Pacific
 RIO – Radar Intercept Officer (NFO in F-4 Phantom II and F-14 Tomcat)
 RL – Restricted Line Officer
 RM – Radioman
 RMD – Restricted Maneuvering Doctrine
 RPM – Remedial Project Manager
 RP – Religious Program Specialist
 RPOC – Recruit Petty Officer in Charge or Recruit Chief Petty Officer
 ROM – Restriction of movement (14 day quarantine during COVID-19)
 RT – Radiotelephone (voice radio)
 RTC – Recruit Training Command
 RTD – Return to Duty

S
 S2F – Speed to Fleet
 SA – Seaman Apprentice
 SAG – Surface Action Group
 SAM – Surface-to-Air Missile
 SAPR – Sexual Assault Prevention and Response
 SARC – Special Amphibious Reconnaissance Corpsman
 SAU – Search and Attack Unit
 SCAT – Small Craft Attack Team
 SCBA – Self-Contained Breathing Apparatus
 SCPO – Senior Chief Petty Officer
 SCRAM – Safety Control Rod Axe Man. Reactor emergency shutdown 
 SCW – Seabee Combat Warfare Specialist insignia
 SE – Support Equipment
 SES – Surface Effect Ship, class/type of ship
 SEL – Senior Enlisted Leader (also seen as SEA – Senior Enlisted Advisor)
 SEALs – United States Navy SEALs (stands for Sea, Air, Land), officially termed Special Warfare Operators (SO)
 SEAOPDET – Sea Operational Detachment
 SECDEF – Secretary of Defense (United States)
 SECNAV – Secretary of the Navy (United States)
 SICLOS – Shift Inspect Clean Lube Oil Strainers
 Sitrep  – Situation report
 SLBM – Submarine-Launched Ballistic Missile
 SN – Seaman
 SNA – Student Naval Aviator
 SO – Special Warfare Operator, aka US Navy SEAL.
 SOFA – Status of Forces Agreement
 SONAR – Sound Navigation And Ranging
 SOP(A) – Senior Officer Present (Ashore)
 SOPA – Senior Officer Present Afloat
 SOQ – Sailor of the Quarter
 SOY – Sailor of the Year
 SPAWAR – Space and Naval Warfare Systems Command
 SPAWARSYSCEN – Space and Naval Warfare Systems Center
 SR – Seaman Recruit
 SRB – Selective Reenlistment Bonus
 SRW – Shutdown Roving Watch
 SS – Submarine Specialist
 SS – Submarine, class/type of ship
 SSBN (aka Boomers) – Hull classification symbol for ballistic missile submarine (Submersible Ship Ballistic Nuclear)
 SSES – Ships Signals Exploitation Space: compartment on a ship where embarked NAVSECGRU personnel, known a Cryptologic Technicians, do their work
 SSGN – Hull classification symbol for cruise missile submarine (Submersible Ship Guided Missile Nuclear)
 SSMG – Ships Service Motor Generator; engine room equipment used to convert electrical current from AC to DC or DC to AC
 SSN – Hull classification symbol for general-purpose fast attack submarines (Submersible Ship Nuclear)
 SSOQ – Senior Sailor of the Quarter
 SSOY – Senior Sailor of the Year
 SSTG – Ships Service Turbo Generator
 STG – Sonar Technician Surface
 STREAM – Standard Tension Replenishment Alongside Method
 STS – Sonar Technician Submarines
 SUBRON – Submarine Squadron
 SUBSAFE – Submarine Safety Program
 SUPPO – Supply Officer
 SWCC (swick) – Special Warfare Combatant-craft Crewmen, the Special Operations Forces who operate and maintain an inventory of boats used to conduct special operations missions or to support special operations missions conducted in maritime environments, particularly those of the U.S. Navy SEALs.
 SWO – Surface Warfare Officer

T
 TAD – Temporary Additional Duty, equivalent to Army's TDY
 TADCEN – Training and Distribution Center
 TAO – Tactical action officer (fights the ship under the supervision of the captain)
 TAR – Training and Administration of the Reserve (U.S. Navy Reserve, former designation for FTS personnel)
 TE – Task element
 TF – Task force
 TFO – Temporary flight orders. Non-aircrew personnel that have passed the minimum requirements to act as part of the aircrew for some purpose, e.g. secondary door gunner.
 TFOA – Things falling off aircraft
 TG – Task group
 TLD – Temporary limited duty
 TM – Torpedoman's mate
 TOPGUN – United States Navy Fighter Weapons School
 TSP – Troubled systems process
 TU – Task unit
 TYCOM – Type commanders

U
 UA – Unauthorized Absence, equivalent to Army's absent without leave (AWOL)
 UA – Urinalysis
 UAS – Unmanned Aerial System
 UAV – Unmanned Aerial Vehicle
 UCMJ – Uniform Code of Military Justice
UCT – Underwater Construction Team
 UDT – Underwater Demolition Team
 UNODIR – Unless Otherwise Directed
 UNREP – Underway Replenishment
 UNSAT – Unsatisfactory
 UOD – Uniform of the day
 URL – Unrestricted Line Officer
 USCG  – United States Coast Guard
 USMC – United States Marine Corps, organized under the United States Department of the Navy
 USN – United States Navy
 USNA – United States Naval Academy (Annapolis)
 USNR – United States Naval Reserve
 USS – United States Ship
 UWT – Underwater Telephone

V
 VA/VAM – Fixed Wing Attack/Fixed Wing Medium Attack (no longer used)
 VAQ – Fixed Wing Electronic-Attack Squadron
 VAW – Fixed Wing Airborne Early Warning Squadron
 VBSS – Visit, Board, Search, and Seizure
 VCNO – Vice Chief of Naval Operations
 VDS – Variable Depth Sonar
 VERTREP – Vertical Replenishment
 VF – Fixed Wing Fighter (no longer used)
 VFA – Fixed Wing Strike Fighter Squadron
 VLS – Vertical Launching System
 VP – Fixed Wing Patrol Squadron
 VRC – Fleet Logistics Support Squadron (VRC-30 Providers)
 VTU – Volunteer Training Unit
 VX – Air Test & Evaluation Squadron (VX-4 Evaluators)

W
 WAVES – Women Accepted for Volunteer Emergency Service
 WCS – Workcenter Supervisor
 WO – Warrant Officer
 WSO – (Wizzo) – Weapon Systems Officer (Naval Flight Officer) in USMC F/A-18D Hornet and USN F/A-18F Super Hornet)
 WTC – Watertight Compartment
 WTD – Watertight Door
 WTF – Whiskey Tango Foxtrot, usually an interrogative phrase, but may also be used in a declarative manner
 WTH – Water Tight Hatch

X
 XO – Executive Officer

Y
 YN – Yeoman

See also
 List of acronyms
 List of military slang terms
 Glossary of nautical terms (A-L)
 Glossary of nautical terms (M-Z)
 United States Navy bureau system
 List of U.S. government and military acronyms
 List of U.S. Marine Corps acronyms and expressions
 List of U.S. Air Force acronyms and expressions

Notes

References

External links

 Navy Acronyms and Navy Abbreviations
 EEBD - Emergency Escape Breathing Device

Z
Acronyms list
Navy
Navy
Navy
United states Navy